Events in the year 2009 in Burkina Faso.

Incumbents 

 President: Blaise Compaoré
 Prime Minister: Tertius Zongo

Events

June 
June–September – Several rivers throughout the country flooded, causing 150,000 people flee their homes, mostly in the capital Ouagadougou.
June 26 – The Ruins of Loropéni were added to the list of UNESCO World Heritage Sites. The Ruins were the second out of three total sites in Burkina Faso to be added to the list, and was the country's first cultural UNESCO site.

September 
September 8 – The IFC invested $2 million into the mining economy of Burkina Faso for exploration of natural resources.

October 
October 1 – Burkina Faso's government designates 12 areas of interest as Ramsar Sites.

Deaths

References 

 
2000s in Burkina Faso
Years of the 21st century in Burkina Faso
Burkina Faso
Burkina Faso